Dibamus vorisi is a species of legless lizard in the family Dibamidae. The species is endemic to Borneo.

Etymology
The specific name, vorisi, is in honor of American herpetologist Harold Knight Voris (born 1940) of the Field Museum of Natural History.

Habitat
The preferred natural habitat of D. vorisi is forest.

Description
The tail is short, about 14% SVL in males, and only about 6% SVL in females.

Reproduction
D. vorisi is oviparous.

References

Further reading
Das I, Lim KKP (2003). "Two new species of Dibamus (Squamata: Dibamidae) from Borneo". Raffles Bulletin of Zoology 51 (1): 137–141. (Dibamus vorisi, new species).
Das I (2004). Lizards of Borneo: A Pocket Guide. Kota Kinabalu, Borneo: Natural History Publications. 89 pp. .
Das I (2006). A Photographic Guide to Snakes and other Reptiles of Borneo. Sanibel Island, Florida: Ralph Curtis Books. 144 pp. . (Dibamus vorisi, p. 12).

Dibamus
Endemic fauna of Borneo
Reptiles of Indonesia
Reptiles of Malaysia
Reptiles described in 2003
Taxa named by Indraneil Das
Reptiles of Borneo